Hassock may refer to:

 Kneeler, a cushion or a piece of furniture for resting during Christian prayer
 Ottoman (furniture), a footstool
 Tuffet, a low seat

See also
 Hassocks, a village in West Sussex, England